Joe is a 1970 drama film written by Norman Wexler and directed by John G. Avildsen. It stars Peter Boyle, Dennis Patrick, and Susan Sarandon in her film debut.

Plot
Advertising executive Bill Compton, his wife Joan, and daughter Melissa are a wealthy family living in New York's Upper East Side. Melissa has been living with her drug-dealing boyfriend. After Melissa overdoses and is sent to a hospital, Compton goes to her boyfriend's apartment to get her clothes. He confronts and kills the boyfriend in a fit of rage. At a nearby bar he hears factory worker Joe Curran ranting about how he hates hippies, and Compton blurts out that he just killed one. Joe reacts favorably, but Compton says it was a joke.

A few days later, Joe sees a news report about a drug dealer found slain a few blocks from the bar. He calls Compton and meets him. At first Compton is wary that Joe may be attempting blackmail, but Joe assures him that he admires Compton for killing the drug dealer. They become friends, and Compton and his wife have dinner at Joe's house with his wife. Melissa escapes from the hospital and returns to the family apartment, where she overhears her father discussing the murder. She storms out of the apartment house, saying to Compton, "What are you gonna do, kill me too?" Compton tries to restrain her, but she breaks away.

Joe and Compton search for her, and meet a group of hippies at a bar in downtown Manhattan. They join the hippies at an apartment, where the hippies share their drugs and girlfriends with the pair. They then abscond with drugs brought by Compton, which he had taken from the drug dealer, as well as Joe's and Compton's wallets. Joe beats one of the girls until she tells him that their boyfriends often spend time in an upstate commune. Joe and Compton drive to that commune, with Joe bringing rifles. In a confrontation at the commune, Joe and Compton kill all the hippies there, and Compton unwittingly kills his own daughter.

Cast
 Peter Boyle as Joe Curran
 Dennis Patrick as Bill Compton
 Audrey Caire as Joan Compton
 Susan Sarandon as Melissa Compton
 K Callan as Mary Lou Curran
 Marlene Warfield as Bellevue Nurse
 Patrick McDermott as Frank Russo

Reception and legacy
The film has garnered both critical acclaim and box office success. Produced on a tight budget of only $106,000, it was a sleeper hit and grossed over $19.3 million in the United States and Canada, making it the 13th highest-grossing film of 1970. Joe received mostly positive reviews from critics, earning an 82% "Fresh" rating on the review aggregate website Rotten Tomatoes from 11 reviews. Norman Wexler's screenplay received an Oscar nomination for Best Original Screenplay.

Quentin Tarantino wrote in his book Cinema Speculation that Joe is "a kettle-black comedy about class in America, bordering on satire", and said that although contemporary viewers may find it controversial to call the film a black comedy, he recalled that the audience he saw the film with in 1970, in a double feature with Carl Reiner's Where's Poppa?, watched the first section of Joe in silence, only to begin laughing "once Dennis Patrick enters the tavern, and Peter Boyle's Joe enters the movie,", having gone from "repulsed repose to outright hilarity". Tarantino says that "Boyle's comedic performance alleviates the picture's one-note ugliness". Variety wrote, "It sounds like heavy stuff, but scripter Norman Wexler has fleshed his serious skeleton with both melodrama plotting that sustains interest and the grittiest, most obscene dialog yet to boom from the silver screen. It works." Howard Thompson of The New York Times wrote, "The sad, disappointing thing about 'Joe' is that a devastating, original idea cynically slopes into a melodramatic, surface fiasco." Gene Siskel of the Chicago Tribune gave the film three-and-a-half stars out of four and called it "a landmark film because of the issues and social norms it justifies. It is a dramatic, if not always sophisticated, documentary of a growing portion of the national mentality." Charles Champlin of the Los Angeles Times called it "an immensely sophisticated piece of film-making," adding, "The plot is laced with implausibilities and the movie full of scenes which are heavily contrived but which play well because they are swept along by the plausibility of Joe himself." Gary Arnold of The Washington Post called it "a fascinating, tendentious picture—a topical murder melodrama and social parable, done in that vivid, loaded, paranoid style which seems to have become a tradition in record time but which remains exciting to watch, even if you question the drift and outcome of the parable." Penelope Gilliatt of The New Yorker wrote, "In the end, 'Joe' sells us short. It shows us clashing archetypes, promises us something of large mind, and then stammers platitudes that lead theatrically every which way."

When Peter Boyle saw audience members cheering the violence in Joe, he refused to appear in any other film or television show that glorified violence. This included the role of Jimmy "Popeye" Doyle in The French Connection (1971). The role would earn Gene Hackman the Oscar for Best Actor. Boyle nevertheless played a ruthless gangster in 1973's The Friends of Eddie Coyle and in 1974's Crazy Joe (not a sequel) and a not-so-ruthless gangster in the comedy Johnny Dangerously.  He also appeared in the violent drama Taxi Driver. Joe inspired the creation of other tough, working class characters in 70s films and TV shows, including the character of Archie Bunker on the TV show All in the Family.

In the 1980s, there were rumors that Peter Boyle might appear in a sequel to Joe. Citizen Joe, the sequel, would follow Joe as he tried to rebuild his life after spending 10 years in prison and would also deal with his grown up kids who held more liberal beliefs. Cannon Films periodically took out ads for unmade sequels to Joe. In 1980, Cannon promised Joe II then, in 1985, announced the coming of Citizen Joe: The man has changed but the times have not...He's back. The film never materialized.

Accolades
Norman Wexler was nominated for Best Original Screenplay at the 43rd Academy Awards.

Real-life parallel
Ten weeks before Joe was released in the United States, a real-life mass murder with similarities to the movie's climactic scenes occurred in Detroit, Michigan. On May 7, 1970, a railroad worker named Arville Douglas Garland entered a university residence and killed his daughter, her boyfriend and two other students.

During pre-trial deliberations, Judge Joseph A. Gillis saw Joe and strongly advised both the prosecution and defense teams to do the same. He then carefully screened each member of the jury pool and excluded any who had seen the movie. He also forbade any seated juror from watching the movie or discussing it with anyone who had seen it.  Although he brought with him multiple weapons and extra ammunition, Garland received a light sentence.

Before and after sentencing, Garland received hundreds of letters from parents across the country who expressed sympathy with him. It was also reported that during the first weeks after his sentencing, he received no letters expressing outrage or condemnation of his actions.

Soundtrack
Joe also featured an original soundtrack, introducing artists such as Exuma with the song "You Don't Know What's Going On", Dean Michaels' "Hey Joe" (not a version of the song made famous by Jimi Hendrix), and other original songs by Jerry Butler and Bobby Scott.

See also
 List of American films of 1970

References

External links

1970 films
1970 drama films
1970s black comedy films
1970s exploitation films
1970 independent films
1970s vigilante films
American drama films
American exploitation films
American independent films
American vigilante films
1970s English-language films
Films directed by John G. Avildsen
Films set in New York (state)
Films set in New York City
Films shot in New York City
Films with screenplays by Norman Wexler
Golan-Globus films
Hippie films
1970s American films